Jimmy Two-Shoes (also known as JTS; or as Jimmy Cool in most parts of Europe) is a Canadian animated children's television series produced by Canadian-based companies Breakthrough Entertainment, Mercury Filmworks and Elliott Animation that aired on Disney XD in the United States, Teletoon in Canada, Jetix (later Disney Channel) in Europe. The series centers on the exploits of the happy-go-lucky title character, who lives in Miseryville, a miserable town filled with monsters and demon-like creatures. The series was created by Edward Kay and Sean Scott.

The series originally premiered in the United States on February 13, 2009, and in Canada on March 21, 2009. The final episode aired on July 15, 2011, in the United States and April 5, 2012, in Canada, with reruns continuing until December 2017.

Premise
The series follows the adventures of Jimmy, a happy-go-lucky boy who makes it his mission to find fun everywhere he goes. This is a challenge because Jimmy lives in Miseryville, the unhappiest town around, run by the megalomaniacal Lucius Heinous the Seventh. Miseryville has one main industry: Misery Inc., purveyors of putrid products guaranteed to cause grief; and they do not come with a money-back guarantee. Along with his best friends Heloise (part-time genius, full-time soul-crusher who secretly adores him) and Beezy (adventure lover, couch potato, and Jimmy's definitive best friend), Jimmy is determined to surf past all obstacles and bring his infectious enthusiasm to the whole town.

Characters

Locations 
Miseryville - The town under the control of Lucius Heinous VII. Its purpose is to sustain the lowest quality of life possible. The planet Miseryville is on (and Miseryville may be the entire planet) is shaped like the Miseryville logo, and it has a red sky and three suns. Its inhabitants are mostly monsters except for Jimmy and Heloise who are pretty much the only humans there. Lucius's factory overshadows the town. The town is surrounded by tall mountains, grassy meadows, forests, and volcanoes. It seems as though all of the lakes and other places that should contain water contain lava instead but the characters can swim in them without burning up (usually). Although it is stated that it has never snowed in Miseryville "Invasion of the Weavils" shows Jimmy going to two places that have snow and ice. There are screens and cameras that Lucius (and occasionally Samy or Heloise) use to communicate to Miseryvillians all over town, some hidden in the most unlikely places, such as cakes and trees. Although the town is considered a terrible place to live it does have fun places like theaters, swimming pools, beaches, etc. (although they all seem to have some horrible twist). There was once what appeared to be a school in the episode "Scent of a Heinous" during an ad for Heinous Perfume, complete with buses, searchlights, chain gates, lockers, and a total of three girls. After this episode it is never shown again.
Misery Inc. - A huge factory run by Lucius, which resembles a large face. The workers in the factory make various products intended to make people miserable. The factory is destroyed in many episodes and it's almost always Jimmy's fault. Heloise has a laboratory there, Lucius has an office where he lives most of the time, there is a huge "conference room", and there are TVs and cameras everywhere. Many monsters work there against their will and get no time off, no pay, and no benefits from their jobs.
Clownburg. - A part of Miseryville where the Rodeo Clowns live.
The Abyss of Nothingness - Seen in a few episodes, it is said to be a vast black hole filled with misery and despair from which no one can escape. Although almost everyone who has been thrown into it appears in later episodes with no explanation of how they got out. Lucius tries to use it to get rid of Jimmy and Heloise. On Lucius' birthday, it is renamed "The Birthday Abyss of Nothingness" and has a party hat floating over the top. And during a race between Jimmy and Beezy, they run into it only to reappear only seconds later with Beezy wearing a parka and Jimmy wearing traditional Mexican clothing.
Jimmy's House - Is seen in many episodes as a simple white house with a red roof, two windows, and a light red door. Two trees are standing beside it. Jimmy's house is between Beezy's and Heloise's house. Their houses are separated by hedges. (Jimmy and Beezy can be seen playing games such as 'Ultra Target'; a game where one player catapults another player towards a giant circular board with different colored squares on it. Different 'Bonus Points' are given depending on the day of the week.) When chained to the side of the house, Cerbee will sometimes drag Jimmy's house away, usually bringing it back after a few days. Jimmy's bedroom, shown in a few scenes, is extremely large.
Beezy's House - Usually shown to be a big messy pile of junk inside. In 'The Butley Did It' Beezy hires a butler named 'Butley' to clean it. After doing so, many different treasures are found, such as a skateboard half-pipe and a coffee table. It is also shown that there is a cannon in his house, as he fires himself out of it in one episode. In Bus Driving BFF Chuck describes it as the darkest and disgusting place in Miseryville. Beezy's house is a unique place with its skull-like appearance and horns. Two windows resemble eyes on its gray surface. It looks extremely similar to his father's house. A ghost made up of rejected pizza crusts that Beezy never ate also lives there until Beezy ate him.
Heloise's House - Heloise's house is a tall blue building. It is filled with traps and gadgets that are usually triggered by Jimmy and/or Beezy. Despite the traps, her house is basically normal on the inside. The living room is very large with a fireplace and a couch. Behind a bookcase, there is a secret shrine to Jimmy, although it is shown in Pet Rocky it can be entered through the fireplace. The bedroom is colored blue with a blue bed. Contrary to her personality, there are many girly things about her house such as a pink computer and other various decorations. The back yard is filled with tombstones. There is also a barbecue in the back yard, which she uses quite often.
Miseryville Beach - A beach beside an ocean of lava. Most people don't swim in it because it's filled with sea monsters, and under the sand are lava worms that eat the citizens.
The Chocolate Lake - A hidden lake of chocolate under Misery Inc. Lucius has forbidden anyone to even touch it, but in the episode "There Will Be Chocolate" it was discovered by Jimmy, Beezy, and Heloise.
Miseryville Golf Course - A mini-golf course that was built on a volcano.
Misery Island - A popular vacation spot that is only visited during Spring Break. It has two sides; one pleasant and nice, and the other evil and deadly.

Production
According to Edward Kay, a 6-minute not-for-air demo was funded by one of the investors with the intention that the series would be for an older youth audience. The original concept has the location taking place in Hell with the characters having similar yet somewhat different attributes than they had in the final show. The concept was later re-worked and revamped with many of the mature elements removed as it was considered too edgy for a 6-11 market.

Episodes

Season 1 (2009)

Season 2 (2010–11)

Broadcast
Jimmy Two-Shoes was broadcast in Canada on Teletoon in the English, and French-language channels, in the latter case under the name of Jimmy l'Intrépide. In the United States, it aired on Disney XD, premiering on February 13, 2009. The show began broadcasting in the United Kingdom and Ireland on April 18, 2009, on Jetix, in pair with the show's premiere in the rest of Europe on the same channel. In most of Europe, the series was called Jimmy Cool; in Italy, Jimmy Jimmy, and in France it is Jimmy l'Éclate. The New Zealand premiere was in 2010 on TVNZ. The show aired in Southeast Asia on Cartoon Network and Latin America on Nickelodeon starting in 2009. A DVD of the series was released on May 28, 2013.

Reruns were carried by Boomerang in Australia and New Zealand, beginning on October 6, 2014. It also aired on CITV's Toonattik Programming Block in the United Kingdom.

In the United States, the show, as of 2022, currently streams on Tubi, Pluto TV, and Peacock.

Reception 
Jimmy Two-Shoes has a rating of 5.9/10 on IMDb as of October 2022. Common Sense Media described the series as "(a) jumbled stew of violent humor, overly arch wit, and broad jokes that may not be tough for kids to grasp (but may be too silly for grown-ups)", and said that it's best for teens and young adults who still have a juvenile sensibility.

Awards 
Jimmy Two-Shoes won the award for the best animated television program for children for the episode "Toast Busters/Beezy 2.0" at the Awards of Excellence 2013. The series was also nominated for 2 awards for best-animated series or program and best performance in an animated series or program at the 2011 Gemini Awards, but lost to Hot Wheels Battle Force 5.

References

Notes

External links 

 Full credits for "Jimmy Two Shoes"
 
Jimmy Two-Shoes at epguides.com

2000s Canadian animated television series
2009 Canadian television series debuts
2010s Canadian animated television series
2011 Canadian television series endings
Canadian children's animated action television series
Canadian children's animated adventure television series
Canadian children's animated comedy television series
Canadian children's animated fantasy television series
Canadian flash animated television series
Disney XD original programming
English-language television shows
Jetix original programming
Teen animated television series
Teletoon original programming
Television series by 9 Story Media Group